The 2017 Saarland state election was held on 26 March 2017 to elect the members of the Landtag of Saarland. The incumbent grand coalition of the Christian Democratic Union (CDU) and Social Democratic Party (SPD) led by Minister-President Annegret Kramp-Karrenbauer was returned with an increased majority.

Even though the Saarland is the second smallest state by population and does not represent Germany as a whole demographically, the election proved to be of pivotal importance to the following state elections and in particular the federal election later that year. Then-SPD leader Martin Schulz led the party to new heights in early 2017 and polls showed the SPD capturing the Minister-President's office in this first election of the year, but the upset CDU victory marked the beginning of a decline in the polls both nationally and in other state elections. This decline culminated in heavy losses for the SPD in Schleswig-Holstein, in North Rhine-Westphalia and, ultimately, in the 2017 German federal election.

Background
The 2012 state election was called after the collapse of the Jamaica coalition of the CDU, Free Democratic Party (FDP) and The Greens. The election saw the collapse of the FDP, a downswing for The Left and Greens, gains for the SPD, and the entry of the Pirates. Afterwards, the CDU and SPD formed a grand coalition.

Parties
The table below lists parties represented in the previous Landtag of Saarland.

Opinion polling

Party polling

Minister-President polling

Election result

|-
| colspan=8| 
|-
! colspan="2" | Party
! Votes
! %
! +/-
! Seats 
! +/-
! Seats %
|-
| bgcolor=| 
| align=left | Christian Democratic Union (CDU)
| align=right| 217,263
| align=right| 40.7
| align=right| 5.5
| align=right| 24
| align=right| 5
| align=right| 47.1
|-
| bgcolor=| 
| align=left | Social Democratic Party (SPD)
| align=right| 158,057
| align=right| 29.6
| align=right| 1.0
| align=right| 17
| align=right| 0
| align=right| 33.3
|-
| bgcolor=| 
| align=left | The Left (Linke)
| align=right| 68,566
| align=right| 12.8
| align=right| 3.3
| align=right| 7
| align=right| 2
| align=right| 13.7
|-
| bgcolor=| 
| align=left | Alternative for Germany (AfD)
| align=right| 32,971
| align=right| 6.2
| align=right| New
| align=right| 3
| align=right| New
| align=right| 5.9
|-
! colspan=8|
|-
| bgcolor=| 
| align=left | Alliance 90/The Greens (Grüne)
| align=right| 21,392
| align=right| 4.0
| align=right| 1.0
| align=right| 0
| align=right| 2
| align=right| 0
|-
| bgcolor=| 
| align=left | Free Democratic Party (FDP)
| align=right| 17,419
| align=right| 3.3
| align=right| 2.1
| align=right| 0
| align=right| ±0
| align=right| 0
|-
| bgcolor=| 
| align=left | Family Party of Germany (FAMILIE)
| align=right| 4,435
| align=right| 0.8
| align=right| 0.9
| align=right| 0
| align=right| ±0
| align=right| 0
|-
| bgcolor=| 
| align=left | Pirate Party (Piraten)
| align=right| 3,979
| align=right| 0.7
| align=right| 6.7
| align=right| 0
| align=right| 4
| align=right| 0
|-
| bgcolor=| 
| align=left | National Democratic Party (NPD)
| align=right| 3,744
| align=right| 0.7
| align=right| 0.5
| align=right| 0
| align=right| ±0
| align=right| 0
|-
| bgcolor=|
| align=left | Others
| align=right| 5,957
| align=right| 1.1
| align=right| 
| align=right| 0
| align=right| ±0
| align=right| 0
|-
! align=right colspan=2| Total
! align=right| 533,783
! align=right| 100.0
! align=right| 
! align=right| 51
! align=right| ±0
! align=right| 
|-
! align=right colspan=2| Voter turnout
! align=right| 
! align=right| 69.7
! align=right| 8.1
! align=right| 
! align=right| 
! align=right| 
|}

Outcome
Observers were surprised by the CDU's strong performance, as opinion polls predicted a close contest between the CDU and SPD. After the election, several commentators described the results as a boost for the September 2017 electoral prospects of German Chancellor Angela Merkel and the CDU, and as a setback for SPD leader Martin Schulz.

As both the CDU and SPD refused to coalition with AfD, the CDU and SPD coalition reached an agreement to continue governing together after the election.

References 

2017 elections in Germany
Elections in Saarland
March 2017 events in Germany